Paulo Rodrigues da Silva (10 November 1986 – 2 January 2012) was a Brazilian professional footballer, who played as a striker for the Czech club Viktoria Plzeň. He died on 2 January 2012 following a car crash near Bohutín (Příbram District).  He was 25.

References

External links
 Paulo Rodrigues da Silva at Eurofotbal
 

1986 births
2012 deaths
Brazilian footballers
Brazilian expatriate footballers
FK Fotbal Třinec players
FC Viktoria Plzeň players
1. FK Příbram players
Czech First League players
Brazilian expatriate sportspeople in the Czech Republic
Expatriate footballers in the Czech Republic
Road incident deaths in the Czech Republic
Association football midfielders